The 2011–12 Ohio State Buckeyes men's basketball team represented Ohio State University during the 2011–12 NCAA Division I men's basketball season. Their head coach is Thad Matta, in his 8th season with the Buckeyes. The team plays its home games at Value City Arena in Columbus, Ohio, and is a member of the Big Ten Conference. The team clinched a share of the Big Ten regular season championship for the third year in the row with a 13–5 conference record, sharing it with Michigan and Michigan State. In the postseason, the team was invited to the 2012 Big Ten Conference men's basketball tournament, where they beat Purdue and Michigan before losing to Michigan State in the championship, and they also were invited to the 2012 NCAA Division I men's basketball tournament, where they beat Loyola, Gonzaga, Cincinnati, and an upset of Syracuse before losing to Kansas in the Final Four to finish the season with 31–8 in overall record.

Pre-season

Previous season
Ohio State, led by experienced seniors and player of the year candidate Jared Sullinger, started the season 24–0. The Buckeyes were ranked No. 1 for six weeks during the regular season, as well as entering postseason play, and earned the No. 1 overall seed in the NCAA tournament with an overall regular season record of 29–2 along with a Big Ten tournament championship.  After defeating UT–San Antonio and George Mason in the first two rounds of the tournament, Ohio State fell to the Kentucky Wildcats, who would eventually go on to the Final Four, 62–60, ending their season in the Sweet Sixteen for the second year in a row.

Departures
 No. 10 Eddie Days – G
 No. 23 David Lighty – G/F
 No. 24 Nikola Kecman – F
 No. 33 Jon Diebler – G
 No. 52 Dallas Lauderdale – F

2011 recruiting class

Roster

Schedule

|-
!colspan=12| Exhibition

|-
!colspan=12| Regular season

|-
!colspan=12| Big Ten Regular Season

|-
!colspan=12| Big Ten tournament

|-
!colspan=12| NCAA tournament

Rankings

References

Ohio State Buckeyes basketball

Ohio State Buckeyes men's basketball seasons
Ohio State
Ohio State
NCAA Division I men's basketball tournament Final Four seasons
Ohio State Buckeyes
Ohio State Buckeyes